False Fronts is a 1922 American silent drama film directed by Samuel R. Brodsky and starring Edward Earle, Madelyn Clare and Frank Losee.

Cast
 Edward Earle as Keith Drummond
 Madelyn Clare as 	Marjorie Kembler
 Frank Losee as John Lathrop
 Barbara Castleton as Helen Baxter
 Bottles O'Reilly as Jackie Parker

References

Bibliography
 Connelly, Robert B. The Silents: Silent Feature Films, 1910-36, Volume 40, Issue 2. December Press, 1998.
 Munden, Kenneth White. The American Film Institute Catalog of Motion Pictures Produced in the United States, Part 1. University of California Press, 1997.

External links
 

1922 films
1922 drama films
1920s English-language films
American silent feature films
Silent American drama films
American black-and-white films
1920s American films
Films directed by Samuel R. Brodsky